Konstantinos Gouvis (born 10 March 1994 in Heraklion) is a male former water polo player from Greece. He won with the Greek team the bronze medal at the 2013 Mediterranean Games. He was part of the Greek team at the 2013 World Aquatics Championships in Barcelona, Spain, where they finished in 6th place. He played for Olympiacos.

Honours
N.O. Vouliagmeni
National Cup of Greece (1): 2016–17

See also
 Greece at the 2013 World Aquatics Championships

References

External links
 profile on fina.infostradasports.com

Greek male water polo players
Living people
Place of birth missing (living people)
1994 births
Sportspeople from Heraklion
Olympiacos Water Polo Club players
Mediterranean Games medalists in water polo
Mediterranean Games bronze medalists for Greece
Competitors at the 2013 Mediterranean Games
World Aquatics Championships medalists in water polo